The Chinese water shrew (Chimarrogale styani) is a species of mammal in the family Soricidae. It is found in China and Myanmar.

References
 

Chimarrogale
Taxonomy articles created by Polbot
Mammals described in 1899